Geshem the Arabian (or Geshem the Arab; Hebrew: גֶשֶׁם הָעַרְבִי) is an Arab man mentioned in the Hebrew Bible. He was an ally of Sanballat and Tobiah and adversary of Nehemiah (Neh. 2:19, 6:1). In Neh. 6:6 he is called "Gashmu," which is probably more correct, as an Arab tribe named "Gushamu" is known (Cook, "Aramaic Glossary," s.v. גשמו). When Nehemiah proceeded to rebuild the walls of Jerusalem, the Samaritans and the Arabs made efforts to hinder him. Geshem or Gashmu, who probably was the chief of the Arabs, joined the Samaritans and accused Nehemiah of conspiracy against the Persian king.

Identification
Three sources possibly refer to the Geshem who opposed Nehemiah. A 5th-century B.C. Aramaic inscription from Egypt refers to a certain "Qaunu, the son Gashmu, the king of Kedar." Kedar was one of the main Arab groups in this period. Moreover, both a contemporary account and a king list from Dedan mention Gashmu. If Nehemiah's "Geshem the Arab" was indeed a Kedarite king, his influence would have stretched from northern Arabia to include Judah.

References

5th-century BC Arabs
Hebrew Bible people
Ancient Arabs